In mathematics, in particular abstract algebra, a graded ring is a ring such that the underlying additive group is a direct sum of abelian groups  such that . The index set is usually the set of nonnegative integers or the set of integers, but can be any monoid. The direct sum decomposition is usually referred to as gradation or grading.

A graded module is defined similarly (see below for the precise definition). It generalizes graded vector spaces. A graded module that is also a graded ring is called a graded algebra. A graded ring could also be viewed as a graded -algebra.

The associativity is not important (in fact not used at all) in the definition of a graded ring; hence, the notion applies to non-associative algebras as well; e.g., one can consider a graded Lie algebra.

First properties 
Generally, the index set of a graded ring is assumed to be the set of nonnegative integers, unless otherwise explicitly specified. This is the case in this article.

A graded ring is a ring that is decomposed into a direct sum
 
of 
additive groups, such that 

By definition of a direct sum, every nonzero element  of  can be uniquely written as a sum  where each  is either 0 or homogeneous of degree . The nonzero  are the homogeneous components of .

Some basic properties are:
For any ,  is a two-sided -module, and the direct sum decomposition is a direct sum of -modules.
  is an associative -algebra.

A homogeneous ideal is the direct sum of its homogeneous parts.

 

Basic examples
This is called the trivial gradation on R.
The polynomial ring  is graded by degree: it is a direct sum of  consisting of homogeneous polynomials of degree i.
Let S be the set of all nonzero homogeneous elements in a graded integral domain R. Then the localization of R with respect to S is a -graded ring.
If I is an ideal in a commutative ring R, then  is a graded ring called the associated graded ring of R along I; geometrically, it is the coordinate ring of the normal cone along the subvariety defined by I.

Graded module
The corresponding idea in module theory is that of a graded module, namely a left module M over a graded ring R such that also

and

Example: a graded vector space is an example of a graded module over a field (with the field having trivial grading).

Example: a graded ring is a graded module over itself. An ideal in a graded ring is homogeneous if and only if it is a graded submodule. The annihilator of a graded module is a homogeneous ideal.

Example: Given an ideal I in a commutative ring R and an R-module M, the direct sum  is a graded module over the associated graded ring .

A morphism  between graded modules, called a graded morphism, is a morphism of underlying modules that respects grading; i.e., . A graded submodule is a submodule that is a graded module in own right and such that the set-theoretic inclusion is a morphism of graded modules. Explicitly, a graded module N is a graded submodule of M if and only if it is a submodule of M and satisfies . The kernel and the image of a morphism of graded modules are graded submodules.

Remark: To give a graded morphism from a graded ring to another graded ring with the image lying in the center is the same as to give the structure of a graded algebra to the latter ring.

(cf. Serre's twisting sheaf in algebraic geometry.)

Let M and N be graded modules. If  is a morphism of modules, then f is said to have degree d if . An exterior derivative of differential forms in differential geometry is an example of such a morphism having degree 1.

Invariants of graded modules 

Given a graded module M over a commutative graded ring R, one can associate the formal power series :

(assuming  are finite.) It is called the Hilbert–Poincaré series of M.

A graded module is said to be finitely generated if the underlying module is finitely generated. The generators may be taken to be homogeneous (by replacing the generators by their homogeneous parts.)

Suppose R is a polynomial ring , k a field, and M a finitely generated graded module over it. Then the function  is called the Hilbert function of M. The function coincides with the integer-valued polynomial for large n called the Hilbert polynomial of M.

Graded algebra 

An algebra A over a ring R is a graded algebra if it is graded as a ring.

In the usual case where the ring R is not graded (in particular if R is a field), it is given the trivial grading (every element of R is of degree 0). Thus,  and the graded pieces  are R-modules.

In the case where the ring R is also a graded ring, then one requires that 

In other words, we require A to be a graded left module over R.

Examples of graded algebras are common in mathematics:

 Polynomial rings. The homogeneous elements of degree n are exactly the homogeneous polynomials of degree n.
 The tensor algebra  of a vector space V. The homogeneous elements of degree n are the tensors of order n, .
 The exterior algebra  and the symmetric algebra  are also graded algebras.
 The cohomology ring  in any cohomology theory is also graded, being the direct sum of the cohomology groups .

Graded algebras are much used in commutative algebra and algebraic geometry, homological algebra, and algebraic topology. One example is the close relationship between homogeneous polynomials and projective varieties (cf. Homogeneous coordinate ring.)

G-graded rings and algebras 
The above definitions have been generalized to rings graded using any monoid G as an index set.  A G-graded ring R is a ring with a direct sum decomposition

such that

The previously defined notion of "graded ring" now becomes the same thing as an -graded ring, where  is the monoid of natural numbers under addition. The definitions for graded modules and algebras can also be extended this way replacing the indexing set  with any monoid G.

Remarks:
If we do not require that the ring have an identity element, semigroups may replace monoids.

Examples:
A group naturally grades the corresponding group ring; similarly, monoid rings are graded by the corresponding monoid.
An (associative) superalgebra is another term for a -graded algebra. Examples include Clifford algebras. Here the homogeneous elements are either of degree 0 (even) or 1 (odd).

Anticommutativity
Some graded rings (or algebras) are endowed with an anticommutative structure. An anticommutative -graded ring is a ring A graded with respect to Γ such that:

for all homogeneous elements x and y.

Examples
An exterior algebra is an example of an anticommutative algebra, graded with respect to the structure  where  is the quotient map.

Graded monoid 
Intuitively, a graded monoid is the subset of a graded ring, generated by the 's, without using the additive part.

Formally, a graded monoid is a monoid , with a gradation function  such that . Some authors request furthermore that 
when m is not the identity.

Assuming the gradations of non-identity elements are non-zero, the number of elements of gradation n is at most  where g is the cardinality of a generating set G of the monoid. Therefore the number of elements of gradation n or less is at most  (for ) or  else. Indeed, each such element is the product of at most n elements of G, and only  such products exist.  Similarly, the identity element can not be written as the product of two non-identity elements. That is, there is no unit divisor in such a graded monoid.

Power series indexed by a graded monoid
 
This notions allows to extends the notion of power series ring. Instead of having the indexing family being , the indexing family could be any graded monoid, assuming that the number of elements of degree n is finite, for each integer n.

More formally, let  be an arbitrary semiring and  a graded monoid. This sum is correctly defined (i.e., finite) because, for each m, there are only a finite number of pairs  such that .

Example
In formal language theory, given an alphabet A, the free monoid of words over A can be considered as a graded monoid, where the gradation of a word is its length.

See also
 Associated graded ring
 Differential graded algebra
 Filtered algebra, a generalization
 Graded (mathematics)
 Graded category
 Graded vector space
 Tensor algebra
 Differential graded module

References

 .
 
 

Algebras
Ring theory